Michael Crowder (9 June 1934 – 14 August 1988) was a British historian and author notable for his books on the history of Africa and particularly on the history of West Africa.

Early life and education
Michael was born in London and educated at Mill Hill School. After earning a first class honours degree in Politics, Philosophy and Economics (PPE) at Hertford College, Oxford in 1957, he returned to Lagos (he had previously been conscripted to the Nigeria Regiment in Lagos from 1953 to 1954 for his British national service) to become first Editor of Nigeria Magazine in 1959.

Academic career
Michael commenced his career as a secretary at the Institute of African Studies at the University of Ibadan. In 1964 he was Visiting Lecturer in African History at the University of California, Berkeley and Director of the Institute of African Studies at Fourah Bay College, University of Sierra Leone in 1965.

While in Nigeria from 1968 to 1978 he was appointed as Research Professor and Director of the Institute of African Studies at the University of Ife (Now Obafemi Awolowo University). Afterwards, he became Professor of History at Ahmadu Bello University and finally as Research Professor in History at the Centre for Cultural Studies at the University of Lagos in the 1970s. He worked as an editor for the British Magazine History Today after his return to London in 1979. He was also Visiting Fellow at the Centre for International Studies at the LSE, and Professor of History at the University of Botswana in the 1980s while he worked as a Consultant Editor until his death.

Selected books
The Story of Nigeria (1962)
Eze Goes to School, co-authored with Onuora Nzekwu (1963)
West Africa Under Colonial Rule (1968)
West African Resistance (1971)
West Africa: An Introduction to its History (1977)
Akin Goes to School, co-authored with Christie Ade Ajayi (1978)
Colonial West Africa (1978)
The Cambridge History of Africa (1984)

See also
John Fage, another early Africanist specialising in West Africa
Anthony Kirk-Greene
Ibadan School

References

Bibliography

1934 births
1988 deaths
Academic staff of the University of Lagos
Academic staff of Ahmadu Bello University
Historians of Nigeria
British expatriates in Nigeria
20th-century British historians
Academic staff of Obafemi Awolowo University
People educated at Mill Hill School
Academics from London
Academic staff of the University of Botswana
Academic staff of Fourah Bay College
English historians
English Africanists
Alumni of Hertford College, Oxford
Royal West African Frontier Force officers